Calonectria pyrochroa is a fungal plant pathogen infecting tea.

See also
 List of tea diseases

References

External links

Nectriaceae
Fungal plant pathogens and diseases
Tea diseases
Fungi described in 1878